Glangrwyney or Glangrwyne is a village  southeast of Crickhowell in Powys, Wales. Glangrwyney is in the Vale of Grwyney Community for administrative purposes. The village is built upon the sands and gravels of a dissected alluvial fan which extends into the floodplain of the Usk, together with till derived from the former Usk Valley glacier.

Facilities in the village include a village hall and The Bell public house. The former army training camp of Cwrt y Gollen is on the western edge of the village.

References

Villages in Powys
Black Mountains, Wales